Yakov Petrovich Legzdin) (September 24, 1893 Bolderāja, Russian Empire — 1954, Leningrad, Soviet Union) — was the captain of the icebreaking ship Krasin from 1932 to 1933. He also captained the S. Makarov, Jakutija, and Papanin during the course of his career.

A cape and gulf in the Barents Sea are named in honor of Legzdin.

1893 births
1954 deaths
Soviet Navy personnel